And the Angels Sing is a 1944 musical film directed by George Marshall and starring Dorothy Lamour, Fred MacMurray, and Betty Hutton. Released by Paramount Pictures, it is a classic example of a film written to capitalize on the title of a previously popular song, in this case Benny Goodman's 1939 number one hit, "And the Angels Sing" by Ziggy Elman and Johnny Mercer, sung by Martha Tilton, though the song is not actually in the film.  The standout original songs in the musical were "It Could Happen To You", sung by Dorothy Lamour, which quickly became a pop standard, and "His Rocking Horse Ran Away", which became one of Betty Hutton's most popular numbers.

The story is about a singing sister group, their exploitation by a bandleader, and their subsequent rise to fame. One of the sisters is portrayed by Mimi Chandler, daughter of former Kentucky governor and baseball commissioner Happy Chandler. "Happy" is also the name of Fred MacMurray's character in the story.

Time magazine wrote about the film at the time, "From [the start of] Happy's two-timing, [it] gets more & more complicated and less & less funny. Too much of this dizzy story shows signs of hard labor; about half is rather enjoyable. Betty Hutton (The Miracle of Morgan's Creek) gets funnier with every picture. She is the most startling expression of natural force since the Johnstown Flood.

Plot
The four Angel sisters are singers, although all wish to pursue other careers. At a roadhouse, bandleader Happy Marshall makes a pass at Nancy Angel, but she already has a boyfriend, cab driver Oliver.

After the girls are paid just $10 for a performance, Bobby Angel gambles with her sisters' money and wins $190. But she is conned out of it by Happy, whose band needs it to make a trip to Brooklyn to perform at a club. Bobby thinks he wants to both hire and romance her, neither of which is true.

Happy ends up falling for Nancy, and the girls' act is so good, the club's owner will not hire Happy's band in the future without them. Nancy is fine with the arrangement, particularly when Bobby ends up falling for Happy's friend in the band, Fuzzy.

Cast
 Dorothy Lamour as Nancy Angel
 Betty Hutton as Bobby Angel
 Diana Lynn as Josie Angel
 Mimi Chandler as Patti Angel
 Raymond Walburn as Daddy Angel
 Fred MacMurray as Happy Marshall
 Eddie Foy, Jr. as Fuzzy
 Frank Albertson as Oliver
 Mikhail Rasumni as Schultz

See also
List of American films of 1944

References

 Film Review 1945 by F. Maurice Speed

External links 
 
 
 New York Times Movie Review

1944 films
Paramount Pictures films
American black-and-white films
Films scored by Victor Young
Films directed by George Marshall
Benny Goodman songs
1944 musical films
American musical films
1940s English-language films
1940s American films